The Club of Vienna is an international association which has 24 members and interested in social, scientific, economic and ecological issues.

Areas of Focus 
Particular attention is given to:

 intellectual, cultural, ecological and economic potential in the area of conflict between regional and national interests
 the trend towards globalization
 possible scenarios for the city of Vienna.

Founding president 
Rupert Riedl (1925-2005)

Current topics of the Club of Vienna 

Consequences of migration in Europe: opening of the east, transit, currents of traffic, economic consequences, social issues, culture; advantages and disadvantages
Participatory decision-making in democracy 
Acceleration phenomena
Non-material indicators of prosperity
The new capitalism
Europe in the 21st century – two differing speeds?
Slaves and masters in information society
Sustainability as an investment principle
Examine "The Reasons of Growth"

Literature 

 Kapitalismus gezähmt? Weltreligionen und Kapitalismus (H. Knoflacher, K. Woltron, A. Rosik-Kölbl, editors), 2006. Verlag echo media, Vienna
 Wege in den Postkapitalismus (K. Woltron, H. Knoflacher, A. Rosik-Kölbl, editors), 2004. Verlag edition selene, Vienna
 Die Ursachen des Wachstums. Unsere Chancen zur Umkehr (R. Riedl, M. Delpos, editors), 1996. Verlag Kremayr und Scheriau: Vienna

See also
 Peak Oil
 Club of Rome
 Club of Budapest

References

External links
 Official home page

Futures studies organizations
Political and economic think tanks based in Europe
Think tanks based in Austria
Globalism